The City of Shasta Lake, known as Central Valley or CV prior to incorporation, is a city in Shasta County, California, United States. It is the closest settlement to Shasta Dam and Shasta Lake reservoir, which are popular tourist destinations. Its population is 10,371 as of the 2020 census, up from 10,164 from the 2010 census.

History

Shasta Lake City started out as five small communities named Central Valley, Toyon, Project City, Pine Grove, and Summit City, all of which came about with the beginning of construction of Shasta Dam in 1938. Project City was built at the intersection of U.S. Route 99 and Shasta Dam Boulevard, a larger Central Valley at a midpoint on Shasta Dam Blvd., Summit City at the intersection of Shasta Dam Boulevard and Lake Boulevard, and Pine Grove at what today is the intersection of Interstate 5 and Pine Grove Avenue.

Toyon 
The Bureau of Reclamation built the town of Toyon, first called Government Camp. By 1950 Toyon had two tennis courts, an outdoor basketball court, a Community Center, green lawns, concrete side walks, commercial water and power from Shasta Dam, its own sewage treatment plant, and its own landfill. Initially, Toyon also had two large dormitories for bachelor employees. All the residents of Toyon worked for the US Bureau of Reclamation. Bureau headquarters office and maintenance facilities were located on Kenneth Ave, parallel to Shasta Dam Blvd.

All bureau employees were forced to vacate Toyon by the end of 1964 when the facility was turned over to the Job Corps as a work camp as a part of President Lyndon Johnson's Great Society. The Job Corps supervision ended in 1972. Toyon was subsequently occupied by local Native Americans who hoped to stake claim and have Toyon recognized as tribal lands; this did not occur. Water and electric power were turned off after the Native Americans failed to pay a $28,000 utility bill. Conflicts between law enforcement and the occupying Native Americans continued, and a large number of the homes burned to the ground. The historic Seaman Ranch Community House and the large USBR headquarters building also burned to the ground in this era. Today, one metal storage building and the flagpole are the only remaining structures other than overgrown streets and sidewalks. The site is fenced off from Shasta Dam Blvd.

The workers at Shasta Dam built these communities because land was cheap and most families needed a low cost home while working on the dam. Later on, Central Valley became the commercial hub of workers on Shasta Dam. Initially, there was no water supply for these new communities, and attempts at digging wells produced very limited water supplies.

When oil production slowed down in the 70s Redding surpassed Central Valley in population in 1965? when it incorporated the community of Enterprise.?)The population figures in 1980 were Central Valley at 3,424, Project City at 1,659, and Summit City at 1,139. Talks of Incorporation spread in 1993 and incorporation became a reality on July 2, 1993, when 60% of the communities' people voted for incorporation.

A new McDonald's, Burger King inside the Chevron station, and several gas stations and a few motels encompass the area of the Shasta Dam Hwy and Interstate 5 interchange. These were all built around 2000 and several more fast food outlets and motels are planned for this interchange. Starbucks recently opened up, right next to Rite Aid and then closed a few months thereafter.

Geography
Shasta Lake is located at  (40.678167, -122.370003).

Climate
Shasta lake has a hot-summer Mediterranean climate (Csa) typical of the Northern California interior. Summers are hot and dry, with great diurnal temperature variation, while winters and wet and cool.

Demographics

2000 Census
As of the 2000 United States Census of 2000, there were 9,008 people, 3,391 households, and 2,377 families residing in the city.

Racial makeup 
 87.82% White
 0.72% African American
 4.43% Native American 
 0.36% Asian
 0.09% Pacific Islander 
 2.00% from other races
 4.58% from two or more races
 6.18% Hispanic or Latino of any race

Household composition
 34.3% had children under the age of 18 living with them 
 48.5% were married couples living together
 15.8% had a female householder with no husband present
 29.9% were non-families 
 23.7% of all households were made up of individuals 
 10.6% had someone living alone who was 65 years of age or older
 The average household size was 2.64 
 The average family size was 3.09

Age ranges 
 28.8% under the age of 18
 7.9% from 18 to 24
 27.3% from 25 to 44
 22.9% from 45 to 64
 13.1% were 65 years of age or older

The median age was 36 years. For every 100 females, there were 97.8 males. For every 100 females age 18 and over, there were 93.2 males.

Income levels
The median income for a household in the city was $26,275, and the median income for a family was $33,010. Males had a median income of $31,418 versus $20,951 for females. The per capita income for the city was $13,678. About 16.5% of families and 20.1% of the population were below the poverty line, including 25.1% of those under age 18 and 6.5% of those age 65 or over.

2010 Census
The 2010 United States Census reported that Shasta Lake had a population of 10,164. The racial makeup of Shasta Lake was 8,749 (86.1%) White, 67 (0.7%) African American, 389 (3.8%) Native American, 233 (2.3%) Asian, 13 (0.1%) Pacific Islander, 201 (2.0%) from other races, and 512 (5.0%) from two or more races. Hispanic or Latino of any race were 865 persons (8.5%).

The Census reported that 10,147 people (99.8% of the population) lived in households, 17 (0.2%) lived in non-institutionalized group quarters, and 0 (0%) were institutionalized.

There were 3,943 households, out of which 1,325 (33.6%) had children under the age of 18 living in them, 1,830 (46.4%) were opposite-sex married couples living together, 566 (14.4%) had a female householder with no husband present, 280 (7.1%) had a male householder with no wife present. There were 342 (8.7%) unmarried opposite-sex partnerships, and 33 (0.8%) same-sex married couples or partnerships. 961 households (24.4%) were made up of individuals, and 413 (10.5%) had someone living alone who was 65 years of age or older. The average household size was 2.57. There were 2,676 families (67.9% of all households); the average family size was 3.00.

The population was spread out, with 2,467 people (24.3%) under the age of 18, 844 people (8.3%) aged 18 to 24, 2,511 people (24.7%) aged 25 to 44, 2,877 people (28.3%) aged 45 to 64, and 1,465 people (14.4%) who were 65 years of age or older. The median age was 38.8 years. For every 100 females, there were 99.5 males. For every 100 females age 18 and over, there were 95.9 males.

The homeowner vacancy rate was 2.0%; the rental vacancy rate was 5.2%. 6,588 people (64.8% of the population) lived in owner-occupied housing units and 3,559 people (35.0%) lived in rental housing units.

Schooling
There are five schools located within the city: Grand Oaks Elementary School (K-5), Shasta Lake School (K-8), Buckeye School of the Arts (K-8), Central Valley High School (9-12) and Mountain Lakes High School (10-12). They are all a part of the Gateway Unified School District. Toyon School in Summit City was the first elementary school to open in the Central Valley area (it recently closed and is now home to Mountain Lakes High School). Subsequent schools were Project City and Central Valley elementary. Central Valley High School opened in 1956 ?.

Politics

References

Cities in Shasta County, California
Incorporated cities and towns in California
1993 establishments in California